Jia Qiaojie is a character in the 18th century Chinese novel Dream of the Red Chamber. She is the only child of Jia Lian and Wang Xifeng. She remains a child throughout much of the novel. She is named after the Weaver Girl by Granny Liu, hoping the name will give some good luck and fortune.

In the end of the novel according to the Cheng-Gao version, Granny Liu saves her from being sold into concubinage by her maternal uncle. She and Ping'er are taken to Granny Liu's village in the country, where Qiaojie eventually marries one of Granny Liu's neighbors.

Qiaojie is the youngest of Jinling Twelve Beauties.

Dream of the Red Chamber characters
Fictional characters from Jiangsu
Fictional victims of crime
Child characters in literature